Various entities present a National Football League Rookie of the Year Award each season to the top rookie(s) in the National Football League (NFL). The NFL considers the (rookie) of the year awards by the Associated Press (AP) to be its official honor. The AP awards and Pepsi's rookie of the year award are presented each year at the NFL Honors.-

Associated Press NFL ROTY Award

Offensive ROTY winners (1967–present)

Defensive ROTY winners (1967–present)

Pepsi NFL ROTY Award
Pepsi NFL Rookie of the Year is an award given to the best performing rookie player in the National Football League (NFL). It was first awarded in 2002 and is sponsored by Pepsi. Winners are chosen among five finalists tallied from total votes given to Pepsi NFL Rookie of the Week winners by an online vote on the NFL's official website. The award is sometimes named after other varieties of Pepsi, such as Diet Pepsi and Pepsi Zero.

Winners (2002–present)

Pro Football Writers of America NFL ROTY Award
The Pro Football Writers of America (PFWA) Rookie of the Year awards have been given annually to an offensive and defensive rookie in the NFL since 1969, except in 1985. In 2013, PFWA began selecting an overall NFL rookie of the year in addition to its offensive and defensive honors. The winners are chosen by Pro Football Weekly writers/editors and PFWA members.

Overall ROTY winners (2013–present)

Offensive ROTY winners (1969–present)

Defensive ROTY winners (1969–present)

Sporting News NFL ROTY Award
The Sporting News NFL Rookie of the Year award is chosen annually by NFL players, coaches, and executives. There were 617 voters in 2010, 632 voters in 2011, and over 800 voters in 2012.

NFL ROTY winners (1955–1959)

AFL ROTY winners (1960–1969)

NFL ROTY winners (1960–1969)

AFC ROTY winners (1970–1979)

NFC ROTY winners (1970–1979)

NFL ROTYS winners (1980–present)

Defunct awards

United Press International NFL ROTY Award
United Press International (UPI) awarded an annual NFL Rookie of the Year award from 1955 to 1959 and two annual awards from 1960 to 1996. From 1960 to 1969 the awards went to a rookie from the NFL and American Football League (AFL), and after the AFL–NFL merger in 1970, the awards went to a rookie from the National Football Conference (NFC) and American Football Conference (AFC).

NFL winners (1955–1969)

AFL winners (1960–1969)

NFC winners (1970–1996)

AFC winners (1970–1996)

NEA NFL ROTY Award
The NEA NFL Rookie of the Year award was founded in 1964 by the Newspaper Enterprise Association and was created by Murray Olderman, the senior sports editor for the NEA. From 1971 through 1976 winners for both the American Football Conference and National Football Conference were chosen, except in 1974. The award was discontinued after the 1996 season. Winners were awarded the Bert Bell Memorial Trophy in honor of former NFL commissioner Bert Bell.

Winners (1964–1996)

See also
 List of National Football League awards

References

External links
Pepsi NFL Rookie of the Year

National Football League trophies and awards
 
 
Rookie player awards